{{Infobox military conflict|
image=Bataille de Coutras.jpg|
caption=|
conflict=Battle of Coutras|
partof=the War of the Three Henrys|
date=20 October 1587|
place=Coutras (Gironde)|
result=Huguenot victory|
combatant1= Huguenots|
combatant2= Royalist Army|
commander1= Henry of Navarre|
commander2= Anne de Joyeuse†|
strength1=5,000 infantry  1,800 cavalry|
strength2=5,000 infantry  1,800 cavalry|
casualties1=40 killed|
casualties2=2,000 men, of which  300 nobility|
campaign box=  }}

The Battle of Coutras, fought on 20 October 1587, was a major engagement in the French Religious Wars between a Huguenot (Protestant) army under Henry of Navarre (the future Henry IV) and a royalist army led by Anne, Duke of Joyeuse. Henry of Navarre was victorious, and Joyeuse was killed while attempting to surrender.

 Context 
The Wars of Religion between the Catholics and Protestants in France had begun in 1562 and continued intermittently thereafter, with temporary periods of nominal peace that were often also marked by violence. King Henry III conducted a conciliatory policy, as reflected in the enactment of the Edict of Beaulieu in 1576 and the Edict of Poitiers the following year. But a new crisis arose in 1584 upon the death of the king's only remaining brother, Francis of Alençon. This made Henry of Navarre, a Protestant, heir presumptive to the throne. The League, led by the Duke of Guise, then set the kingdom against the king, who became isolated.

On 18 July 1585, Henry III promulgated an edict canceling all previous edicts, giving precedence "to the Catholics", paying the mercenaries of the League from the Royal Treasury, prohibiting Protestantism in France, and ordering the return of safe Protestant strongholds. Protestants were expelled from power. And while the Guise party won appointments and favours, the king of Navarre was deprived of his functions.

This edict was effectively a declaration of war against the Protestants. Henry of Navarre sought support, initially without success. However, the "privatory bull" (bulle privatoire) by Pope Sixtus V brought him a measure of support from French royalists and Gallican circles; these were joined by the Politiques, supporters of religious tolerance (such as the Governor of Languedoc, Montmorency-Damville) and later England and Denmark, in the wake of the assassination of William of Orange and the success of Spain in its fight against the Protestants of the Netherlands.

Faced with the intransigence of Guise, war was inevitable. Joyeuse was sent south with an army, while Mercoeur invaded Poitou and blocked Condé at La Rochelle.

 Battle 
The clash of the two cavalry forces was to the advantage of the King of Navarre. The Duke of Joyeuse launched a charge at full gallop; by the time they came into contact, his horses were exhausted, and his squadrons of lancers had lost cohesion, rendering them ineffective. For his part, Henry of Navarre adopted an innovative tactic in the disposition of his troops: he inserted the platoons of musketeers (five men abreast) within cavalry squadrons, to improve their support. The charge of the Protestants chevau-légers ('light or medium cavalry') broke the Royalist army, which was routed. The Duke of Joyeuse was defeated, captured, and killed by a pistol shot. 2,000 Catholics were also captured along with Anne's younger brother, Claude Joyeuse (1569-1587), lord of Saint-Sauveur and Jacques d'Amboise, the eldest of the branch of Amboise-d'Aubijoux.

Victory went to the Protestants, led by Henry of Navarre. He recovered the body of Joyeuse and attended a mass in honour of his slain enemies.

 See also 
 French Wars of Religion

 References 

 Sources 
 Pierre Miquel, Les Guerres de religion, Club France Loisirs, 1980, p 342-344
 Pierre de Vayssiére, Messieurs de Joyeuse (1560-1615 ), Paris, Albin Michel, 1926
 There is a detailed account of the battle in Garrett Mattingly's The Armada''.

External links 
 Histoire de la Ligue par Maimbourg - Paris -1684

History of Aquitaine
Battles of the French Wars of Religion
Battles in Nouvelle-Aquitaine
1587 in France
Conflicts in 1587
History of Gironde